Gold Reserve Inc. is a gold mining company founded in 1956 with operations and mining property in Bolivar State, Venezuela.

The company is currently headquartered in Spokane, Washington.

As a part of a 2016 settlement based on a dispute over withdrawal of a gold concession to Gold Reserve, the government of Venezuela entered into a joint venture with the company to mine the Brisas and Las Cristinas goldmines.

See also
 Gold as an investment

References

External links
 

Companies listed on the TSX Venture Exchange
Companies based in Spokane, Washington
Gold mining companies of the United States